The Gloire du sport (French: Glory of Sport) is an award that is given to former athletes, sports leaders, sports coaches and sports journalists, who have greatly contributed to sports in the country of France. The award is given by the Fédération des internationaux du sport français (Federation of French International Sports). The award was first given in 1993.

Selection criteria
The award aims to reward individuals who have had an exemplary career in their fields. The first induction of Glories of Sport were awarded on March 12, 1993. Since then, new honorees are awarded each year. In order to be eligible for the award, if a nominee is still living, then a period of 10 years of time since the end of their career must have passed. In terms of selection criteria, in addition to pure sporting results, the individual's impact and influence on society are also considered.

Most represented disciplines
Among some of the most represented disciplines are: athletics (29), cycling (27), fencing (20), alpine skiing (17), rugby (15), football (13), swimming (13), tennis (12), judo (12), mountaineering (10), basketball (9), rowing (9), aviation (8), boxing (8), wrestling (6), figure skating (5), canoeing (4).

Glories of Sport A–F

Glories of Sport G–K

Glories of Sport L–P

Glories of Sport Q–U

Glories of Sport V–Z

References

External links
Judo Gloire du sport 

Awards established in 1993
Lists of French sportspeople
Sport in France